Postcards is the debut album by Australian alternative rock band Sparkadia. The album was recorded in 2007 in London. Sparkadia worked with producer Ben Hillier who has previously worked with famous acts such as; U2, Blur, Doves, Suede and Depeche Mode. Frontman Alexander Burnett stated that "Postcards is a grower, once you listen to it a few times you begin to appreciate it".

At the J Awards of 2008, the album was nominated for Australian Album of the Year.

Track listing
"Too Much to Do" – 3:10
"Kiss of Death" – 3:15
"Morning Light" – 3:43
"Help Yourself" – 3:10
"Connected" – 4:48
"Our Own Way" – 3:49
"Animals" – 3:01
"Up in the Air" – 3:19
"The Last Thing You Need" – 3:45
"Jealousy" – 4:36
"Space and Time" – 3:48
"Sleeping Lion" – 4:51

Charts

References

2008 albums
Ivy League Records albums
Sparkadia albums